The Cincinnati Southern Bridge, originally the Cincinnati Southern Railroad Swinging Truss Bridge, is a vertical lift bridge that carries the Norfolk Southern Railway's Cincinnati, New Orleans and Texas Pacific Railway over the Ohio River between Cincinnati, Ohio and Ludlow, Kentucky in the United States.

The bridge is composed of four through truss spans: a main span on the northern side of the bridge, a currently unused vertical lift span on the southern side, and two additional spans over the main shipping channels in the center of the bridge. The bridge crosses the Ohio River just downstream from downtown Cincinnati, and can be seen clearly from the lower level of the nearby Brent Spence Bridge.

History

The Cincinnati Southern Railway Bridge was begun in 1875; construction was completed in December, 1877, and the bridge immediately opened to traffic. Its cost exclusive of right of way was $811,683. The  truss bridge was the longest bridge of its type when it was completed.

It was extensively modernized in 1922, and it remains the busiest railroad bridge in the city of Cincinnati today. The modernization replaced a swing span with a vertical lift span that was designed to rise only 13 feet. That was all that was considered necessary for clearance during periods of high water. The span was visually unique in that the swing pier from the original structure was left in place even though it was no longer physically connected to the bridge. Since 1976, the bridge's vertical lift span has been abandoned in its closed position, forcing all ships to pass under the center truss spans. For tall ships, the bridge marks the end of their Ohio River voyage.

See also
List of crossings of the Ohio River

References

External links
 Cincinnati Southern Bridge at Bridges & Tunnels

Railroad bridges in Kentucky
Railroad bridges in Ohio
Bridges in Cincinnati
Bridges over the Ohio River
Norfolk Southern Railway bridges
Southern Railway (U.S.)
Truss bridges in the United States
Swing bridges in the United States
Metal bridges in the United States